The wagtail-tyrants are a genus, Stigmatura, of small South American birds in the family Tyrannidae. They are yellow below and have long black-and-white tails that are frequently cocked.

Species
The three described species are sometimes further split into two species each (i.e., resulting in a total of four species). Additionally, a possibly undescribed species is found in the Orinoco Basin in Venezuela.

 Lesser wagtail-tyrant (Stigmatura napensis)
 Bahia wagtail-tyrant (Stigmatura bahiae)
 Greater wagtail-tyrant (Stigmatura budytoides)
 Caatinga wagtail-tyrant (Stigmatura (budytoides) gracilis)

References

Stigmatura
Taxonomy articles created by Polbot
Taxa named by Philip Sclater
Taxa named by Osbert Salvin